The group stage of the 2022 BWF World Junior Championships – Teams event is the first stage of the competition. It will hold at Palacio de Deportes de Santander in Santander, Spain, from 17 to 22 October 2022.

Group composition 
The draw for 38 teams competing in the tournament were announced on 10 August 2022.

Group A

Indonesia vs Latvia

Malaysia vs Sweden

Indonesia vs Sweden

Malaysia vs Latvia

Indonesia vs Malaysia

Sweden vs Latvia

Group B

India vs Iceland

Slovenia vs China

Australia vs Iceland

India vs China

Slovenia vs Iceland

India vs Australia

Slovenia vs Australia

China vs Iceland

Australia vs China

India vs Slovenia

Group C

Germany vs Georgia

Peru vs Chinese Taipei

Portugal vs Georgia

Germany vs Chinese Taipei

Peru vs Georgia

Germany vs Portugal

Chinese Taipei vs Georgia

Peru vs Portugal

Portugal vs Chinese Taipei

Germany vs Peru

Group D

England vs Canada

Netherlands vs Singapore

Tahiti vs Canada

England vs Singapore

Netherlands vs Canada

England vs Tahiti

Singapore vs Canada

Netherlands vs Tahiti

Tahiti vs Singapore

England vs Netherlands

Group E

Denmark vs South Korea

Thailand vs Slovakia

Finland vs South Korea

Denmark vs Slovakia

Thailand vs South Korea

Denmark vs Finland

Slovakia vs South Korea

Thailand vs Finland

Finland vs Slovakia

Denmark vs Thailand

Group F

Spain vs Norway

Estonia vs Hong Kong

Belgium vs Norway

Spain vs Hong Kong

Estonia vs Norway

Spain vs Belgium

Hong Kong vs Norway

Estonia vs Belgium

Belgium vs Hong Kong

Spain vs Estonia

Group G

United States vs Armenia

Czech Republic vs Sri Lanka

Czech Republic vs Armenia

United States vs Sri Lanka

Sri Lanka vs Armenia

United States vs Czech Republic

Group H

Ukraine vs Japan

Hungary vs Egypt

Ukraine vs Egypt

Hungary vs Japan

Ukraine vs Hungary

Egypt vs Japan

References 

Teams event group stage